The Janesville Cubs were a minor league baseball team that existed from 1941 to 1942 and from 1946 to 1953. Affiliated with the Chicago Cubs, they played in the Wisconsin State League. They were based in Janesville, Wisconsin and played their home games at the Rock County 4-H Fairgrounds. They were also known as the Janesville Bears in 1946.

Year-by-year record

References

Defunct minor league baseball teams
Janesville, Wisconsin
Chicago Cubs minor league affiliates
Wisconsin State League teams
Baseball teams established in 1941
Baseball teams disestablished in 1953
1941 establishments in Wisconsin
1953 disestablishments in Wisconsin
Defunct baseball teams in Wisconsin